Celine Song (born 1989 or 1990) is a Korean-Canadian director, playwright, and screenwriter based in the United States. Among her plays are Endlings and The Seagull on The Sims 4. Her directorial film debut Past Lives was released at 2023 Sundance.

Early life and education 
Song was born in South Korea. Her parents, both artists, moved the family to Canada when she was 12. Her father, Song Neung-han, is a filmmaker.

Song received her MFA in play writing from Columbia University in 2014.

Career 
Song's play Endlings premiered in 2019 at the American Repertory Theater. The show's off-Broadway run opened in March 2020 at New York Theatre Company, but was cut short due to the COVID-19 pandemic. The show tells the story of three older Korean women haenyeos and a Korean-Canadian writer living in New York. In a mixed review, Alexandra Schwartz of The New Yorker described Endlings as "two works spliced roughly together: a traditional play that seeks to depict people’s lives, and a metafictional examination of the playwright’s own motivations, which flirts with honesty before traipsing down a solipsistic path of no return."

In November 2020, Song directed a live production of Chekhov's The Seagull using The Sims 4 on Twitch, called The Seagull on The Sims 4. In a review for Vulture, Helen Shaw praised the experimental play: "I think Song’s game-play/play-game managed the trick by capturing the experience not of going to a show but of working on one. At her urging, viewers brought the quality of attention that comes with collaboration, and that felt like a churning motor under everything, trying to propel the show into being."

Her first television screenwriting job was as a staff writer for the first season of Amazon's The Wheel of Time.

Song's wrote the screenplay for Past Lives, her directorial film debut, about two childhood friends who later reunite as adults (portrayed by Greta Lee and Teo Yoo). The film was produced by A24 and premiered at Sundance Film Festival on January 21, 2023. The Guardian's Benjamin Lee rated it 4/5 stars and praised Song's work: "...as writer, Song manages to keep her dialogue believably light-footed and spare while as director, she confidently and evocatively captures both cities with a breadth that belies her inexperience. It’s a beautiful, transporting film but one made with both feet firmly on the ground." Richard Lawson of Vanity Fair hailed the film as "...understated and yet vast in its consideration of the slow changes of life, of the past ever whispering to the present. The film is as auspicious a debut as one can hope to see at Sundance, the announcement of a filmmaker confident in her craft and generous with her heart."

Personal life 
Song resides in New York City with her husband.

Filmography

References

External links 
 

Year of birth missing (living people)
Living people
21st-century Canadian women writers
Korean women writers
Canadian people of Korean descent
Columbia University alumni
21st-century Canadian dramatists and playwrights
Canadian women dramatists and playwrights
South Korean emigrants to Canada